Provincial assembly elections were held in Nepal on 20 November 2022. The discussion to conduct sooner than later is underway due to interest of leading Nepali Congress while the opposition, CPN (UML) is already demanding for fresh mandate.

Parties

Current composition

Candidates

Alliance



+



Others

Opinion poll

Result

See also 

 2022 elections in Nepal 
 2021 split in the People's Socialist Party, Nepal 
 2021 split in Nepalese Communist Parties

References

2022 elections in Nepal
Provincial elections in Nepal